Ulopeza idyalis is a moth in the family Crambidae. It was described by Francis Walker in 1859. It is found in Sri Lanka, India, as well as on Borneo and Sulawesi.

The forewings have three large costal yellowish-white iridescent semihyaline spots, the middle one much larger than the other two. The third is subdivided and forms a very incomplete band by means of two hindward dots. The costa and veins are mostly pale luteous (muddy yellow). The hindwings are broadly pale yellow along the costa.

References

Moths described in 1859
Spilomelinae